Thirteen Songs may refer to:

Albums 
 13 songs, a 2005 album by Julie Feeney
13 Songs, a 1989 album by Fugazi
13 Songs, a 2005 album by Tim Scott McConnell

See also
"Thirteen" (song), by Big Star
13 Songs and a Thing, a 2003 album by Bob Drake
Volume II: Thirteen Songs from the House of Miracles, a 2001 album by The Two-Minute Miracles